German is a village in the municipality of Rankovce, North Macedonia.

Demographics
According to the 2002 census, the village had a total of 311 inhabitants. Ethnic groups in the village include:

Macedonians 301
Serbs 10

References

Villages in Rankovce Municipality